This is a list of Australian television programs which first aired in 2012, arranged chronological order. Where more than one program premiered on the same date, those programs are listed alphabetically.

Premieres

Free-to-air television

Subscription television

Notes
Breakfast was originally scheduled to premiere on 27 February 2012, but this date was moved forward to 23 February 2012 following former Prime Minister Kevin Rudd's resignation as Minister for Foreign Affairs on 22 February 2012 and the subsequent announcement of an Australian Labor Party leadership spill.
The Strange Calls was available online via ABC iview from 9 October 2012 prior to its television broadcast.

References

2012 in Australian television
Premieres